Ivan Franco Capelli (born 24 May 1963) is an Italian former Formula One driver. He participated in 98 Grands Prix, debuting on 6 October 1985. He achieved three podiums, and scored a total of 31 championship points. From 1998 until 2017 he was a Formula One commentator on the Italian TV station Rai 1.

Early career and F1 entry
Capelli began his career as a kart driver when he was 15 years old, and after four years he moved to the Italian Formula Three Championship.

In 1983 he became Italian Formula Three champion, after dominating the series with nine victories.  After that he moved with the Coloni team to the European Formula Three Championship, and here he was the champion again in 1984.

In 1985 he graduated to the European Formula 3000 Championship with a Genoa Racing March-Cosworth and won one race. The same year he debuted in Formula One, driving a Tyrrell at the European Grand Prix (despite never having driven at Brands Hatch before), and finished fourth in Australia. Nevertheless, he was not picked up for a full-time Formula One drive in 1986. Instead, he contested the 1986 Formula 3000 Championship, still with Genoa Racing, and also raced a BMW in the European Touring Car Championship.

F1 with March
Despite not landing a full-time contract for 1986, Capelli started several F1 races for the AGS team. Meanwhile, Cesare Gariboldi, boss of Genoa Racing, was working with Robin Herd of March to create a new Formula One outfit. Capelli was a core component in their plans. By now, Capelli and Gariboldi had an almost father-son relationship.

In 1987 Capelli was in Formula One full-time with the March team, led by Gariboldi and running Herd's new chassis with a Cosworth V8 normally aspirated engine. Capelli also continued with BMW touring cars for the Schnitzer team, as the March budget was tight (so much that they raced at the Belgian Grand Prix with a detuned 3.3 litre sports car engine rather than the full 3.5l Formula One unit), and the Schnitzer team had works status with BMW, allowing him to be on the German company's payroll. Capelli scored March's first point with sixth at the Monaco Grand Prix and March's return to Formula One was generally seen as competent, professional and promising for the future.

In 1988 Capelli had a March chassis designed by Adrian Newey (later a winner of multiple Constructors' Championships as a designer at Williams, McLaren and Red Bull) combined with a Judd V8 engine (derived from the Brabham-Honda CART engine and the Judd/Honda F3000 unit). March had hoped to be the favoured development partner for this engine, but they found themselves sharing it with the French Ligier team as well as the defending F1 Constructors' Champions Williams who had lost their supply of turbocharged Honda engines to McLaren. Capelli was joined in the team by the British Formula 3 Champion, Brazilian rookie Maurício Gugelmin. They made a strong team and the March 881 was the surprise of the year. At Spa-Francorchamps he scored his first podium with a third place behind Ayrton Senna's and Alain Prost's McLarens (though this was not known until after the season when the Benettons were disqualified for fuel irregularities). Capelli's best finish was second place at the Portuguese Grand Prix where he finished behind Prost. Even better was ahead for the Italian when he became the first non-turbo driver since  to lead a World Championship Grand Prix. This happened on lap 16 of the Japanese Grand Prix at Suzuka when Prost missed a gear coming out of the final chicane and Capelli was able to get ahead before the start/finish line and officially lead the lap. However, Prost used Honda's superior power and was ahead before turn 1. His Judd V8 suffered an electrical failure just three laps later.

However, the momentum did not continue. March had financial problems and a sponsor, Leyton House, acquired a controlling interest. Gugelmin finished third in his home race at Jacarepaguá in 1989, but this was done in the 1988 car. The definitive 1989 Leyton House March was a disappointment, and neither driver challenged for the top in the rest of the year. Capelli in particular only finished once throughout the season (12th in Belgium) and went far enough to be classified on one further occasion (Monaco where he dropped out from 6th place near the end and was classified 11th). Despite this, he was one of only six drivers to start in all of the 16 races of the 1989 season (the others were the McLaren drivers Ayrton Senna and Alain Prost, the Williams duo Riccardo Patrese and Thierry Boutsen, and Benetton's Alessandro Nannini). Team spirit remained intact despite the death of Gariboldi in a car crash and midway through the season Capelli felt happy enough in the team to take up his option for 1990. The new decade started poorly, though. Newey's car (given the prefix CG in honour of Gariboldi) had excellent aerodynamics and exclusive use of Judd's updated V8 engine, but it was intolerant of bumps. It was so bad on the notoriously bumpy Mexico City track that neither driver could control the car and both failed to qualify. Nevertheless, in the next at Paul Ricard in France came a complete turn around in form. Capelli led Gugelmin in a Leyton House 1–2 throughout much of the race. Gugelmin finally retired, and Capelli was overtaken near the end by the Ferrari of Prost with only 3 laps remaining and went on to finish second. Revisions to the car had made it more competitive (ironically Newey left the team shortly before the race to join Williams), but it was the billiard table-smooth track which allowed the result. Despite some promising showings at Silverstone and Hockenheim, it remained their best race of the season.

In 1991, Leyton House was responsible not only for chassis development but also bankrolled the ambitious Ilmor V10 engine programme. With so many new ingredients, results were again sparse, although Capelli often qualified and raced well. When Leyton House's owner Akira Akagi was arrested in connection with the Fuji Bank fraud, the team was in a precarious state. Capelli had signed for Scuderia Ferrari for the '92 season, so he voluntarily stepped down, allowing pay driver Karl Wendlinger to finish the season and personally paid to attend the races he missed to offer support to the team and advice to his rookie substitute.

Ferrari and Jordan
In 1992, Capelli became the first Italian with a regular drive with Ferrari since Michele Alboreto in 1988, after Gianni Morbidelli's one-off race for the team the season before. The Scuderia had gone through a tough time in 1991, but with a new car, the F92A, expectations were high. The new car was not competitive and before the season began Capelli was showing his disappointment. A driver who enjoyed the convivial atmosphere of a family-type team, he struggled to integrate with the bureaucratic structure of early 1990s Ferrari. Losing motivation, the team in turn lost confidence in him and his teammate Jean Alesi gained the upper hand. Capelli was sacked before the season's end. It was the last time until Felipe Massa in 2011 that a Ferrari driver failed to finish on the podium during a season.

This experience seemingly broke his spirit, but those who had worked with him at March still had faith, notably Ian Phillips, then Jordan team manager. Taking a Jordan seat for 1993 alongside young rookie Rubens Barrichello, whom the team hoped would prosper under the more experienced driver, Capelli failed to rediscover the spark that not long ago had marked him as a champion of the future. After failing to qualify for the second race in Brazil, he left the team by mutual consent, being replaced by Thierry Boutsen. He did not race in Formula One again.

Post-F1 career
Following his exit from Formula One, Capelli raced from 1994 to 1996 with a Nissan Primera with mixed results in the German Super Tourenwagen Cup for BMS Scuderia Italia and in some rounds of the Spanish Touring Car Championship in 1995 and 1996. He also became a Formula One commentator from 1998 until 2017 on Italian TV station Rai 1.

Racing record

Career summary

† As Capelli was a guest driver, he was ineligible for championship points.

Complete International Formula 3000 results
(key) (Races in bold indicate pole position; races in italics indicate fastest lap.)

Complete Macau Grand Prix results

Complete Formula One results
(key) (Races in bold indicate pole position, races in italics indicate fastest lap)

 Driver did not finish the Grand Prix, but was classified as he completed over 90% of the race distance.

Complete Super Tourenwagen Cup results
(key) (Races in bold indicate pole position) (Races in italics indicate fastest lap)

Complete 24 Hours of Le Mans results

Complete Porsche Supercup results
(key) (Races in bold indicate pole position) (Races in italics indicate fastest lap)

‡ – Guest driver – Not eligible for points.

External links

 Ivan Capelli career statistics
 F1 Rejects article on Capelli's 1992 season
 Official site

1963 births
Living people
Italian Formula One drivers
Italian Formula Three Championship drivers
FIA European Formula 3 Championship drivers
International Formula 3000 Champions
Japanese Formula Two Championship drivers
World Touring Car Championship drivers
Tyrrell Formula One drivers
AGS Formula One drivers
March Formula One drivers
Leyton House Formula One drivers
Ferrari Formula One drivers
Jordan Formula One drivers
24 Hours of Le Mans drivers
Racing drivers from Milan
International Formula 3000 drivers
Porsche Supercup drivers
24 Hours of Spa drivers
24 Hours of Daytona drivers
Formula One journalists and reporters
David Price Racing drivers
Schnitzer Motorsport drivers
Scuderia Coloni drivers